The  2015 Rising Phoenix World Championships was an IFBB Wings of Strength female professional bodybuilding competition and held in conjunction with the IFBB Texas Pro, the NPC Tim Gardner Texas Extravaganza, and NPC National. It was held on August 20, 2015 to August 22, 2015, at the Grand Hyatt, in San Antonio, Texas, United States.

Call outs

Prejudging
1st - Debi Laszewski, Margaret Martin, Yaxeni Oriquen-Garcia, Alana Shipp, and Helle Trevino
2nd - Monique Jones, Shawna Strong, Isabelle Turell, Aleesha Young, Maria Bello, and Lisa Cross
3rd - Irene Andersen, Christine Envall, Gillian Kovack, Virginia Sanchez, and Shawna Strong
4th - Margaret Martin, Helle Trevino, and Debi Laszewski

Confirmation round
1st - Debi Laszewski, Margaret Martin, Helle Trevino, and Yaxeni Oriquen-Garcia (Yaxeni Oriquen-Garcia and Helle Trevino switched places)
2nd - Isabelle Turell, Alana Shipp, Aleesha Young, and Maria Bello (Alana Shipp and Isabelle Turell switched places)
3rd - Irene Andersen, Monique Jones, Christine Envall, Lisa Cross, Shawna Strong, Virginia Sanchez, and Gillian Kovack (Lisa Cross and Monique Jones switched places; Gillian Kovack and Shawna Strong switched places)
4th - Debi Laszewski, Yaxeni Oriquen-Garcia, Margaret Martin, and Helle Trevino

Prize money
1st $50,000 + Jeep
2nd $25,000
3rd $12,500
4th $7,000
5th $5,000
Total: $99,500 + Jeep

Results

Overall results
1st - Margaret Martin
2nd - Helle Trevino
3rd - Debi Laszewski
4th - Yaxeni Oriquen-Garcia
5th - Alana Shipp
6th - Aleesha Young
7th - Isabelle Turell
8th - Maria Bello
9th - Lisa Cross
10th - Christine Envall
11th - Shawna Strong
12th - Virginia Sanchez
13th - Monique Jones
14th - Irene Andersen
15th - Gillian Kovack

Scorecard

Best poser winner
Winner - Margaret Martin

Notable events

Due to injuries, Alina Popa stated in an interview that she will attend, but not participate in the 2015 Wings of Strength Rising Phoenix World Championships.
This is the first year since 1998 that Iris Kyle would not attend an IFBB professional bodybuilding competition of that particular year due to her retirement from the sport.
The first competition was held on Iris Kyle's 41st birthday.
Both Vera Mikulcova and Jana Bendova qualified, but did not attend.
One of the two emcees was Lenda Murray.
All of the competitors received a rose after individual posing.
All 15 competitors did the posedown.
The IFBB professional women's bodybuilding cash prize for first place was five times that of the IFBB professional men's bodybuilding first place cash prize.

2015 Rising Phoenix World Championships Qualified

Points standings

 In the event of a tie, the competitor with the best top five contest placings will be awarded the qualification. If both competitors have the same contest placings, than both will qualify for the Rising Phoenix World Championships.

See also
2015 Mr. Olympia
2016 Rising Phoenix World Championships

References

2015 disestablishments in Texas
2015 establishments in Texas
2015 in American sports
Female professional bodybuilding competitions
 
2015 in bodybuilding